Brett Hoebel is an American personal trainer best known for appearing as a trainer on the U.S. reality television show The Biggest Loser: Couples 4 in 2011. He coached the majority of the contestants on the Red Team that season and was touted as one of the "Unknown Trainers" with a mixed martial arts background. 

He appeared on the Food Network reality TV show Fat Chef in 2012, which follows overweight chefs in their struggles to lose weight over a four-month period.

In 2013, he was a judge on the online reality show Fit or Flop.

He grew up in New Jersey, and graduated from Princeton High School in 1989. He is a 1993 graduate of Claremont McKenna College in California.

References

External links

Living people
Year of birth missing (living people)
Place of birth missing (living people)
Participants in American reality television series
American exercise instructors
Claremont McKenna College alumni
People from Princeton, New Jersey
Princeton High School (New Jersey) alumni